The Apostolic Prefecture of Qiqihar (or Tsitsikar) is a Latin Church missionary jurisdiction in Heilongjiang province, China. Its cathedral episcopal see is the Cathedral of St. Michael in the city of Qiqihar. It is exempt, i.e. directly subject to the Holy See, not part of any ecclesiastical province.

History 
 It was established on 9 July 1928 as Mission sui juris of Qiqihar (Tsitsikar), on territories split off from the Apostolic Vicariate of Jilin and the Apostolic Vicariate of Rehe
 On 17 August 1931, it was promoted as Apostolic Prefecture of Qiqihar / Tsitsikar.

Ordinaries and precursor 
(all Latin Church)

 Ecclesiastical Superior of the Independent Mission of Qiqihar (Tsitsikar)
 Eugène-Jean Imhof (1929.04.28 – 1931.08.17 see below)Apostolic Prefects of Qiqihar 
 Eugène-Jean Imhof (see above'' 1931.08.17 – death 1934.01.17)
 Paul Hugentobler, Society of Bethlehem Mission Immensee (S.M.B.) (1934.11.09 – death 1972.06.27)
 Paul Guo Wenzhi (1989 – 2000.08)
 Joseph Wei Jingyi (2000.08 – ...), succeeding as previous Coadjutor of Qiqihar (1995 – 2000.08)

See also
Roman Catholicism in China

Source and External links 
 GigaCatholic, with incumbent biography links

Apostolic prefectures
Roman Catholic dioceses in China
Christianity in Heilongjiang
1928 establishments in China